Winters House may refer to:

in the United States (by state then town)
Winters House (Sacramento, California), listed on the National Register of Historic Places (NRHP)
Old Winters Ranch/Winters Mansion, Carson City, Nevada, listed on the NRHP in Washoe County
Van Koert-Winters House, Franklin Lakes, New Jersey, listed on the NRHP in Bergen County 
Aaron Winters House, Franklin Lakes, New Jersey, listed on the NRHP in Bergen County
Winters-Courter House, Franklin Lakes, New Jersey, listed on the NRHP in Bergen County
Winters-Wimberley House, Wimberley, Texas, listed on the NRHP
Frederick W. Winters House, Bellevue, Washington, listed on the NRHP in King County